Nicholas Cley was the member of the Parliament of England for Marlborough for the parliament of September 1397.

References 

Members of Parliament for Marlborough
English MPs September 1397
14th-century English politicians
Year of birth unknown
Year of death unknown